Hermadionella nipponicus  is a scale worm known from Japan in the north-west Pacific Ocean from the intertidal zone.

Description
Hermadionella nipponicus has up to about 64 segments with 15 pairs of elytra, which bear a fringe of papillae. The lateral antennae are positioned ventrally on the prostomium, directly beneath the median antenna (almost completely obscured in dorsal view). The prostomium also bears a pair of acute anterior projections on the anterior margin. Notochaetae are about as thick as the  neurochaetae, and the neurochaetae bear bidentate tips

References

Phyllodocida